The 1976–77 Honduran Liga Nacional season was the 11th edition of the Honduran Liga Nacional.  The format of the tournament remained the same as the previous season.  C.D. España won the title after defeating C.D. Motagua in the finals. Both teams qualified to the 1977 CONCACAF Champions' Cup.

1976–77 teams

 Broncos (Choluteca)
 Campamento (Catacamas, promoted)
 España (San Pedro Sula)
 Federal (Tegucigalpa)
 Marathón (San Pedro Sula)
 Motagua (Tegucigalpa)
 Olimpia (Tegucigalpa)
 Platense (Puerto Cortés)
 Universidad (Tegucigalpa)
 Vida (La Ceiba)

Regular season

Standings

Final round

Cuadrangular standings

Final

Top scorer
  Oscar Hernández (Marathón) with 10 goals

Squads

Known results

Round 1

Round 2

Round 3

Round 4

Round 5

Round 6

Round 7

Round 11

Cuadrangular

Unknown rounds

References

Liga Nacional de Fútbol Profesional de Honduras seasons
1
Honduras